Regulus Therapeutics Inc. or Regulus is a clinical stage biopharmaceutical company focused on the development of first-in-class drugs that target microRNAs to treat a broad range of diseases. Regulus was established in September 2007 by Alnylam Pharmaceuticals and Isis Pharmaceuticals.

microRNA explained 
MicroRNAs are small naturally occurring RNA molecules, typically 20 to 25 nucleotides in length, that do not encode proteins but instead have evolved to regulate gene expression.

anti-miR therapeutics 
Anti-miR therapeutics inhibit specific microRNA targets. Animal models showed that modulating microRNAs through anti-miRs effectively regulates biological processes and provides therapeutic benefit to cardiac dysfunction, cancer and hepatitis C virus infection. Administration of anti-miR oligonucleotides is possible through local or parenteral injection. The company's lead drug candidate, RG-012, is intended as a treatment for alport syndrome in phase 2 clinical trials.

Strategic alliances 
In April 2008, Regulus and GlaxoSmithKline (GSK) entered into a microRNA-focused strategic alliance for the discovery, development and commercialization of novel microRNA-targeted therapeutics to treat inflammatory diseases such as rheumatoid arthritis. In February 2010, Regulus and GSK announced a new collaboration to develop and commercialize microRNA therapeutics targeting microRNA-122 (miR-122) for the treatment of hepatitis C (HCV) infection. Most recently, the multinational pharmaceutical giant Sanofi –Aventis awarded Regulus with the largest microRNA partnership to date – targeting fibrosis.

Research collaborations 
Regulus has active collaborations with leading academic researchers from over 30 academic research laboratories globally.

Patents 
Regulus has more than 900 patents and patent applications, 600 of which cover the method of use, chemical modification and administration of oligonucleotides to address specific targets.

References

External links
Regulus Therapeutics official website

Companies listed on the Nasdaq
Pharmaceutical companies of the United States
Health care companies based in California